Shandong Lingong Construction Machinery Co., Ltd. (abbreviated SDLG), founded in 1972, is a subsidiary corporation of Volvo Construction Equipment, headquartered in Linyi, Shandong. Shandong Lingong Construction Machinery Co. is one of the most important manufacturers of construction machinery and mining equipment, diesel engines and industrial gas turbines in China, with equipment exports to Brazil, and some countries in Africa. SDLG is also a subsidiary of the Volvo brand.

References

External links
 Official website

Truck manufacturers of China
Construction equipment manufacturers of China
Volvo Group